Winniki may refer to the following places:
Winniki, Masovian Voivodeship (east-central Poland)
Winniki, Opole Voivodeship (south-west Poland)
Winniki, West Pomeranian Voivodeship (north-west Poland)
Polish name for Vynnyky, a city in Ukraine